Trombidium hyperi is a species of mite in the genus Trombidium in the family Trombidiidae. It is found in New York, USA.

Like T. auroraense, the larvae are ectoparasites on adult alfalfa weevils (Hypera postica).

References
 Synopsis of the described Arachnida of the World: Trombidiidae

Further reading
  (1977): New Mites Recovered from the Alfalfa Weevil in New York: Trombidium hyperi n. sp. and T. auroraense n. sp. (Acari: Trombidiidae). Journal of the Kansas Entomological Society 50(1): 89-107. Abstract

Trombidiidae
Animals described in 1977
Endemic fauna of New York (state)
Parasites of insects
Parasitic acari